The 2016 Northern Colorado Bears football team represented the University of Northern Colorado in the 2016 NCAA Division I FCS football season. They were led by sixth-year head coach Earnest Collins Jr. and played their home games at Nottingham Field. They were a member of the Big Sky Conference. They finished the season 6–5, 4–4 in Big Sky play to finish in a tie for sixth place.

Schedule

Source: Schedule

Game summaries

Rocky Mountain (MT)

at Abilene Christian

at Colorado State

Northern Arizona

at Eastern Washington

at UC Davis

Sacramento State

at Portland State

North Dakota

Montana

at Cal Poly

References

Northern Colorado
Northern Colorado Bears football seasons
Northern Colorado Bears football